The men's 1000 metres in short track speed skating at the 2002 Winter Olympics took place from 13 to 16 February at the Salt Lake Ice Center. This event is remembered for the victory of Australian Steven Bradbury, who benefited from all four other skaters in the final going down ahead of him, while Bradbury stayed on his feet and won gold. It was the first ever Winter Olympics gold medal for Australia.

Records
Prior to this competition, the existing world and Olympic records were as follows:

The following new Olympic records were set during this competition.

Results

Heats
The first round was held on 13 February. There were eight heats of four skaters each, with the top two finishers moving on to the quarterfinals.

Heat 1

Heat 2

Heat 3

Heat 4

Heat 5

Heat 6

Heat 7

Heat 8

Quarterfinals
The quarterfinals were held on 16 February. The top two finishers in each of the four quarterfinals advanced to the semifinals. In quarterfinal 2, Canada's Marc Gagnon was disqualified and Japan's Naoya Tamura advanced.

Quarterfinal 1

Quarterfinal 2

Quarterfinal 3

Quarterfinal 4

Semifinals
The semifinals were held on 16 February. The top two finishers in each of the two semifinals qualified for the A final, while the third and fourth place skaters advanced to the B Final. In the first semifinal, Japan's Satoru Terao was disqualified, with Canada's Mathieu Turcotte, who finished third in the race, advancing to the A final.

Semifinal 1

Semifinal 2

Finals
The five qualifying skaters competed in Final A, while three others raced for 6th place in Final B. As a result of Li Jiajun's disqualification, however, the winner of the B final finished 5th.

Final A

Final B

References

Men's short track speed skating at the 2002 Winter Olympics